Clouds (The Mixtape) is a commercial mixtape by American rapper NF. The mixtape was released on March 26, 2021, through his independent label (Nfrealmusic) with guest appearances from Hopsin and Tech N9ne. It was preceded by the singles "Paid My Dues", "Clouds", and "Lost".

Track listing

Charts

Weekly charts

Year-end charts

References 

2021 mixtape albums
Debut mixtape albums
NF (rapper) albums